The Embassy of the United States of America to Armenia is the diplomatic mission of the United States to Armenia. It is located adjacent to Lake Yerevan along the Yerevan-Etchmiadzin highway.

See also 

 Armenia–United States relations
 Ambassadors of Armenia to the United States
 Ambassadors of the United States to Armenia
 Embassy of Armenia, Washington, D.C.
 Foreign relations of the United States

References

External links
 Official site

Yerevan
United States
Embassy